Angelo Colinelli (31 January 1925 – 29 April 2011) was a French racing cyclist. He rode in the 1951 Tour de France.

References

1925 births
2011 deaths
French male cyclists
Place of birth missing